John William Theodore Youngs (usually cited as J. W. T. Youngs, known as Ted Youngs; 21 August 1910 Bilaspur, Chhattisgarh, India – 20 July 1970 Santa Cruz, California) was an American mathematician.

Youngs was the son of a missionary. He completed his undergraduate study at Wheaton College and received his PhD from Ohio State University in 1934 under Tibor Radó. He then taught for 18 years at Indiana University, where for eight years he was chair of the mathematics department. From 1964 he was a professor at the University of California, Santa Cruz, where he developed the mathematics faculty and was chair of the academic senate of the university.
 
Youngs worked in geometric topology, for example, questions on the Frechét-equivalence of topological maps. He is famous for the Ringel–Youngs theorem (i.e. Ringel and Youngs's 1968 proof of the Heawood conjecture), which is closely related to the analogue of the four-color theorem for surfaces of higher genus.

John Youngs was a consultant for Sandia National Laboratories, the Rand Corporation and the Institute for Defense Analyses as well as a trustee for Carver Research Foundation Institute in Tuskegee. In 1946–1947 he was a Guggenheim Fellow. At the University of Santa Cruz a mathematics prize for undergraduates in named after him.

Sources 
 Obituary in Journal of Combinatorial Theory, vol 13, 1972

References

External links 
 Obituary from the University of California

1910 births
1970 deaths
20th-century American mathematicians
Graph theorists
Topologists
Ohio State University alumni
Indiana University faculty
University of California, Santa Cruz faculty
People from Bilaspur, Chhattisgarh
Wheaton College (Illinois) alumni
Sandia National Laboratories people
American expatriates in India